The free dance (FD) is a segment of an ice dance competition, the second contested. It follows the rhythm dance (RD). Skaters perform "a creative dance program blending dance steps and movements expressing the character/rhythm(s) of the dance music chosen by the couple". Its duration is four minutes for senior ice dancers, and 3.5 minutes for juniors. French ice dancers Gabriella Papadakis and Guillaume Cizeron hold the highest recorded international FD score of 137.09 points.

Background
The free dance (FD) takes place after the rhythm dance in all junior and senior ice dance competitions. The International Skating Union (ISU), the body that oversees figure skating, defines the FD as "the skating by the couple of a creative dance program blending dance steps and movements expressing the character/rhythm(s) of the dance music chosen by the couple". The FD must have combinations of new or known dance steps and movements, as well as required elements. The program must "utilize the full ice surface," and be well-balanced. It must contain required combinations of elements (spins, lifts, steps, and movements), and choreography that express both the characters of the competitors and the music chosen by them. It must also display the skaters' "excellent skating technique" and creativity in expression, concept, and arrangement. The FD's choreography must reflect the music's accents, nuances, and dance character, and the ice dancers must "skate primarily in time to the rhythmic beat of the music and not to the melody alone". For senior ice dancers, the FD must have a duration of four minutes; for juniors, 3.5 minutes.

Gabriella Papadakis and Guillaume Cizeron hold the highest FD score of 137.09 points, which they achieved at the 2022 World Championships. They also hold the six highest recorded FD scores.

Required elements
The ISU announces the specific requirements for the FD each year. For example, the ISU published the rules for the 2022–23 season in April 2022. The following elements make up a well-balanced program: the Dance Lift, the Dance Spin, the Step Sequence, Synchronized Twizzles, and Choreographic Elements.

Footnotes

References

Works cited
 "Special Regulations & Technical Rules Single & Pair Skating and Ice Dance 2022" (S&P/ID 2022). Lausanne, Switzerland: International Skating Union. 2022. Retrieved 27 September 2022.

Figure skating
Ice dance